Lina (pronounced "Leena") is a feminine given name. Languages of origin include: English, Italian, Lithuanian, Russian, Spanish, Swedish, Persian, Kurdish, Arabic. It is also the short form of a variety of names ending in -lina including Catalina, Angelina, Carmelina, Carolina, Emelina, Marcelina, Nikolina, Rosalina, Italina, and Žaklina. Lina is a Finnish, Italian, and  Slovene feminine given name that is a feminine form of Lino, Lin, and Linus.

In 2011 it was one of the most popular given female names in Germany. It was initially used as a shortened form of names such as Karolina, Nikolina, Adelina, Evelina and Paulina. Since "-lina" is a diminutive suffix, it has no meaning of its own in Swedish. The Danish and Norwegian form is "Line". 
Lina has since 2019 been one of the most popular female names in France.

The Greek writing is Λίνα. In Greek, it means "sunlight", and also refers to the olive crown used for a hero.

In Persian, it means "light", "a ray of sunlight" or "beautiful girl". In Kurdish, it means cascade falls (تئاڤگەی بچوک). 

Lina is also a short form of any female name ending in "-lina", such as Angelina, Evangelina, Carolina, Melina.

Lina is the female form of Linas, a common given name among people of Lithuanian descent. It can also be construed as a rare feminine form of Linus.

In the Russian language, Lina is a diminutive form of the female name Avelina.

Lina has a different meaning in different languages for example  "Lina" in Arabic refers to a "small, young palm tree", or the Classical plural meaning of "palm trees". It is a direct Quranic Arabic (Classical Arabic) name. Figuratively, Lina means "tender" or "tenderness" and "delicate".

The name Lina also has roots in France and China. In Chinese, "Li" (丽) means "pretty" and "Na" (娜) means "elegant".

Given name

Lina Ahmed (born 1997), Egyptian hurdler
Lina Allemano (born 1979), Canadian musician
Lina Andersson (born 1981), Swedish cross-country skier
Lina Andrijauskaitė (born 1987), Lithuanian track and field athlete
Lina Annab (born 1966), Jordanian businessperson, politician and the previous
Lina Aristodimou (born 1965), Cypriot alpine skier
Lina Attalah (born 1983), Egyptian media figure and journalist
Lina Maria Becker (1898–1976), German politician
Lina Beecher (1841–1915), American inventor and roller coaster engineer
Lina Bejjani (born 1984), Lebanese sprinter
Lina Ben Mhenni (1983–2020), Tunisian Internet activist, blogger and lecturer
Lina Bertucci (born 1958), American artist 
Lina Bo Bardi (1914-1992), Italian-born Brazilian modernist architect
Lina Boqvist (born 25 May 1991), Swedish professional golfer
Lina Boussaha (born 1999), French professional footballer
Lina Braknytė (born 1952), Lithuanian actress
Lina Bruna Rasa (1907–1984), Italian operatic soprano
Lina Bryans 1909–2000), Australian modernist painter
Lina Buffolente (1924–2007), Italian comic artist and illustrator
Lina Carstens (1892–1978), German actress
Lina Chartrand (1948-1994), Canadian writer
Lina Chatkevičiūtė (born 1981), Lithuanian ballroom dancer
Lina Cheryazova (1968–2019), Uzbek freestyle skier
Lina Choueiri, Lebanese linguist
Lina Condes (born 1988), Ukrainian artist
Lina Dencik, British social scientist
Lina Domberg (born 1995), Swedish footballer
Lina Dorado (born 1975), Colombian contemporary artist and filmmaker
Lina Eckenstein (1857–1931), British polymath and historian
Lina Zahr Eddine (born 1975), Lebanese news presenter and talk show host
Lina El Arabi French actress
Lina El Tannir, (born 1987), Egyptian squash player
Lina Englund (born 1975), Swedish actress and musician
Lina Engren (born 1977), Swedish bobsledder
Lina Esco (born 1985), American actress, producer, director and activist
Lina Eve (born 1946), Australian artist, adoption activist, singer/songwriter, photographer and film maker
Lina Fedorova (born 1997), Russian pair skater
Lina Franziska Fehrmann (1900–1950), German artist model
Lina Flor, nickname of Carolina Flores-Trinidad (1914–1976), Filipina writer
Lina Flórez (born 1984), Colombian hurdle athlete
Lina Fruzzetti American film director
Lina Gjorcheska (born 1994), Macedonian tennis player
Lina Glushko (born 2000), Israeli tennis player
Lina Granados (born 1994), Colombian footballer'
Lina Grinčikaitė-Samuolė (born 1987), Lithuanian sprint athlete
Lina Guérin (born 1991), French rugby union player
Lina Haag (1907–2012), German anti-Fascist activist
Lina Hahne (born 1984), Swedish beauty queen and Miss Sweden 2007
Lina Hawyani al-Hasan (born 1975), Syrian novelist, journalist and writer
Lina Frank Hecht (1848–1920), American philanthropists
Lina Hedlund (born 1978), Swedish singer and member of Alcazar
Lina Herasymenko (born 1974), Ukrainian archer
Lina Heydrich (1911–1985), German Nazi and wife of SS-Obergruppenführer Reinhard Heydrich
Lina Hidalgo (born 1991), American politician
Lina Higiro Rwandan businesswoman
Lina Hurtig (born 1995), Swedish footballer
Lina Jacques-Sébastien (born 1985), French sprint athlete
Lina Johansson (born 1988), Swedish former competitive figure skater
Lina Kačiušytė (born 1963), Lithuanian swimmer
Lina Jamil Karam, American electrical and computer engineer
Lina Khan (born 1989) English-born American jurist
Lina Khelif (born 1997), Algerian footballer
Lina Khoury (born 1976), Lebanese theatre director, writer, producer, and educator
Lina Krhlikar (born 1989), Slovenian handball player
Lina Knudsen (born 1985), Danish curler 
Lina Kostenko (born 1930), Ukrainian poet and writer
Lina Krasnoroutskaya (born 1984), Russian retired tennis player
Lina Kuduzović (born 2002), Slovenian singer
Lina Länsberg (born 1982), Swedish mixed martial artist
Lina Lazaar (born 1983), Tunisian art critic
Lina Leandersson (born 1995), Swedish actress
Lina Lehtovaara (born 1981), Finnish football referee
Lina Ljungblom (born 2001), Swedish ice hockey player
Lina Lossen (1878–1959), German stage and film actress
Lina Lundqvist (born 1993), Swedish footballer
Lina Loh (born 1949), Singaporean politician
Lina Magaia (1940–2011), Mozambican writer, journalist and war veteran
Lina Magull (born 1994), German footballer.
Lina Makhul (born 1993), Palestinian singer-songwriter
Lina Mangiacapre (1946–2002), Italian playwright and filmmaker
Lina Marengo (1911–1987), Italian actress
Lina Marín (??–1989), Mexican actress
Lina Marulanda (1980–2010), Colombian television personality and model
Lina Mathon-Blanchet (1903–1994), Haitian pianist, music teacher and composer
Lina Medina (born 1933), the youngest confirmed mother in medical history
Lina Meruane (born 1970), Chilean writer and professor
Lina Mittner (1919–2013), Swiss alpine skier
Lina María Moreno Mejía (born 1955), Colombian First Lady
Lina Morgenstern (1830–1909), German writer, educator, feminist and pacifist
Lina Musharbash, British journalist
Līna Mūze (born 1992), Latvian track and field athlete
Lina Murr Nehmé (born 1955), French-Lebanese author
Lina Ng (born 1974), Singaporean actress and host
Lina Nilsson (born 1987), Swedish retired footballer
Lina Nilsson (scientist), American biomedical engineer
Lina Nyberg (born 1970), Swedish jazz singer and composer
Lina M. Obeid (1955–2019), American physician and cancer researcher
Lina Olsson Rosenberg (born 1971), Swedish handball player
Lina Pagliughi (1907–1980), Italian-American opera singer
Lina Pereira, Brazilian singer, actor, and screenwriter 
Lina Persson (born 1982), Swedish orienteering competitor
Lina Pires de Campos (1918–2003), Brazilian pianist, music educator and composer
Lina Pizzolongo (1925–1991), Canadian vocal coach and concert pianist
Lina Polito (born 1954), Italian actress
Lina Puerta (born 1969), American mixed media artist
Lina Qostal (born 1997), Moroccan tennis player
Lina Rafn (born 1926), Danish female singer, songwriter and producer in the band Infernal
Lina Ramann (1833–1912), German writer and teacher 
Lina Rivas (born 1990), Colombian weightlifter
Lina Rodriguez, Canadian filmmaker
Lina Olinda Pedraza Rodríguez, Cuban politician
Lina Ron (1959–2011), Venezuelan political leader
Lina Rosales (born 1928), Spanish film and television actress
Lina Šaltytė-Masilionė (born 1987), Lithuanian female rower
Lina Santiago (born 1978), American singer and musician
Lina Sarmiento (born 1958), Filipino police officer
Lina Sastri (born 1953), Italian actress and singer
Lina Penna Sattamini, Brazilian interpreter
Lina Scott Gatty (1873–1964), British politician
Lina Shabib, Jordanian politician
Lina Stančiūtė (born 1986), Lithuanian tennis player
Lina Stergiou, Greek architect
Lina Stern (1878–1968), Soviet biochemist, physiologist and humanist
Lina Larissa Strahl (born 1997), German singer-songwriter and actress
Lina Strand (born 1988), Swedish orienteering competitor
Lina Nerli Taviani (born 1937), Italian costume designer
Lina Teoh (born 1976), Malaysian actress, TV Host, model and Miss Malaysia World 1998
Lina Thomsgård (born 1978), Swedish columnist, DJ, and PR consultant
Lina Trivedi (born 1973), American entrepreneur, author, educator and public servant
Lina Tsaldari (1887–1981), Greek politician
Lina van de Mars (born 1979), German TV moderator, motor athlete and drummer
Lina Iris Viktor (born 1987), British-Liberian visual artist
Lina Volonghi (1914–1991), Italian actress
Lina von Perbandt (1836–1884), German painter
Lina Wertmüller (born 1926), Italian film director
Lina Wester (born 1992), Swedish ice hockey
Lina Woiwode (1886–1971), Austrian actress
Lina Wolff (born 1973), Swedish novelist and short story writer
Lina Yakubova (1976–2011), American film producer and writer
Lina Yakupova (born 1990), Russian footballer
Lina Yegros (1914–1978), Spanish film actress

Nickname

Lina (American singer) stagename of Shelina Wade, American recording artist
Lina (South Korean singer), stagename of Lee Ji-yeon (born 1984) South Korean singer who is a member of The Grace
Lina, nickname of Savelina Fanene, who is better known as Nia Jax (born 1984), American professional wrestler and model
Lina Basquette, whose birthname is Lena Copeland Baskette (1907–1994), American actress
Lina Bo Bardi whose birthname was Achillina Bo (1914–1992), Italian-born Brazilian modernist architect
Lina Cavalieri, whose birthname is Natalina Cavalieri (1874–1944), Italian operatic soprano, actress, and monologist
Lina Espina-Moore, whose birthname was Austregelina Espina (1919–2000), Filipina writer
Lina Gennari, whose birthname was Carolina Gennari (1911–1997), Italian actress and operetta singer
Lina Hähnle, whose name is Emilie Karoline Hähnle (1851–1941), German conservationist
Lina Jonn, whose birth name is Carolina Johnsson, (1861–1896), Swedish professional photographer
Lina Joy, converted name of Azlina Jailani, Malay convert
Lina Mayer, whose birthname is Karolína Majerníková, Slovak singer and dancer
Lina Merlin, nickname of Angelina Merlin (1887–1979), Italian politician
Lina Morgan, stage name of María de los Ángeles López Segovia OAXS MML (20 March 1936 – 19 August 2015), Spanish film, theatre and television actress and showgirl
Lina Nikolakopoulou, whose name is Evangelia Nikolakopoulou (Λίνα Νικολακοπούλου) (born 1958), Greek lyricist
Lina Ortega, nickname of Evelina Ortega, American politician
Lina Pasini-Vitale, stagename of Carolina Pasini-Vitale, (1872–1959), Italian soprano
Lina Poletti, nickname of Cordula Poletti (1885– 971), Italian writer, poet, playwright and feminist
Lina Prokofiev, whose birthname is Carolina Codina (1897–1989), Spanish singer
Lina Radke, nickname of Karoline Radke-Batschauer (1903–1983), German track and field athlete
Lina Romay, whose birthname is Rosa María Almirall Martínez (1954–2012). Spanish actress
Lina Romay (singer), whose name is Maria Elena Romay (1919–2010), Mexican-American actress and singer
Lina Sandell, whose birthname is Karolina Wilhelmina Sandell-Berg (1832–1903), Swedish poet and author of gospel hymns
Lina Salomé, stage name of Luz de Peña Matos Estévez, Cuban-born Mexican dancer and actress
Lina Spies, Carellina Pieternella Spies (born 1939), Afrikaans poet and academic
Lina Waterfield, nickname of Caroline Lucie Waterfield (1874–1964), French-born, English journalist

Surname

Fan Lina (fl early 2000s), Chinese sprint canoer
Huo Lina (born 1973), Chinese ice hockey player
Lei Lina (born 1988), Chinese table tennis player
Liu Lina (born 1979), Chinese equestrian
Pan Lina (born 1977), Chinese footballer
Ria Lina (born 1980), British comedian, actress and writer
Wang Lina (athlete) (born 1983), Chinese long jumper
Wang Lina (boxer) (born 1997), Chinese boxer
Wang Lina (sport shooter) (born 1971), Chinese sport shooter
Wang Lina (volleyball) (born 1978), Chinese volleyball player
Xia Lina (born 1987), Chinese female alpine ski racer
Yang Lina (1963–2010), Singaporean actress
Yu Lina (born 1940), Chinese violinist
Zhang Lina (born 1940), Chinese polymer physical chemist
Zhao Lina (born 1991), Chinese footballer

Middle name
Ethel Lina White (1876–1944), British crime writer
Florence Lina Mouissou (born 1972),  Congolese novelist
Domenicangela Lina Unali (born 1936), Italian English Literature Professor

Fictional people 

Lina Braake, protagonist of Lina Braake
Lina Inverse, fictional sorceress from the anime series Slayers
Lina, a heroine in the video game Dota 2
Lina, a heroine from the video game Riviera: The Promised Land
Lina Mayfleet, main character in the Books of Ember
Lina, the maid in Astrid Lindgren's stories of Emil i Lönneberga (Emil of Maple Hill)
Lina Vilkas, protagonist of the novel Between Shades of Gray by Ruta Sepetys 
Lina Lamont, character played by Jean Hagen in the movie Singin' in the Rain
Lina (McLaidlaw), Aysgarth, character played by Joan Fontaine in the movie Suspicion (film)
Lina the dog-like monster, in The Princess and Curdie
Lina, a fairy guide in the game Kinectimals: Now with Bears!
Lina, a fictional character from the web series Petscop
Lina, a fictional character from the TV short series Jay Jay's Mysteries from Jay Jay the Jet Plane
Lena, a fictional character from the animated TV show series DuckTales (2017)
Lina, a character from the multimedia franchise Yo-kai Watch
Lina Leskowitz, a fictional character from the web series Petscop

See also

Li Na (disambiguation)
Wang Lina (disambiguation)
Leena
Lena (name)
Liina
Lina (surname)
Linas

References

Notes

Sources
Н. А. Петровский (N. A. Petrovsky). "Словарь русских личных имён" (Dictionary of Russian First Names). ООО Издательство "АСТ". Москва, 2005. 

Arabic feminine given names
Croatian feminine given names
Danish feminine given names
Dutch feminine given names
English feminine given names
Finnish feminine given names
German feminine given names
Given names derived from plants or flowers
Italian feminine given names
Lithuanian feminine given names
Norwegian feminine given names
Russian feminine given names
Slovene feminine given names
Swedish feminine given names